The latest Minister of Entrepreneur Development and Cooperative is currently Ewon Benedick since 3 December 2022. The minister administers the portfolio through the Ministry of Entrepreneur and Co-operatives Development.

List of Ministers of Entrepreneur
The following individuals have held office as Minister of Entrepreneur:

Political Party:

List of Ministers of Co-operatives
The following individuals have held office as Minister of Co-operatives:

Political Party:

References

Lists of government ministers of Malaysia
Industry ministries